John C. Nagle (1893-1974) was a professional football player. He played in the National Football League in 1921 with the New York Brickley Giants.

Notes

1893 births
1974 deaths
Sportspeople from Reading, Pennsylvania
Players of American football from Pennsylvania
New York Brickley Giants players